The Jensen 541R is a closed four-seater GT-class car built in the United Kingdom by Jensen between 1957 and 1960.

The original aluminium prototype appeared in 1953 as the 541 at the London Motor Show, although this changed to glassfibre for all production cars. It was the fastest four-seater the magazine had ever tested at the time.

The 541R employed a low-revving  straight-six engine from the Austin Sheerline. The suspension system came from the Austin A70 with independent suspension by coil springs at the front and a live axle with semi-elliptic springs at the rear. The 541R, introduced in 1957, differed from the 541 by using rack & pinion steering instead of a cam-and-roller system, and large disc brakes were used on all four wheels.

The car's styling was by Jensen's designer Eric Neale, and was not only considered attractive, but was aerodynamically efficient too; a Cd figure of only 0.39 was recorded, which became the lowest figure at Jensen. The body covered a chassis built by bracing 5-inch (12.7 cm) tubes with a mixture of steel pressings and cross-members to create a platform.

The 1957 model carried the DS7 version of the Austin Sheerline's four-litre motor equipped with twin carburetors on its right side. The cylinder head was reworked for the lifted compression ratio of 7.6:1 and a "long dwell". Only 53 cars were built with the engine.

In total Jensen built 193 541Rs before it was succeeded in 1961 by the Jensen 541S. This was similar to the 541R, but with a larger body and a GM-licensed Rolls-Royce hydramatic gearbox, and only 127 cars were built before the model was discontinued to be replaced by the CV8.

Performance

It was conducted in below-freezing conditions with a "stiff diagonal breeze". 0–60 mph was recorded at 10.6 seconds with fuel consumption at  overall with the normal range given as –.

Further reading

541R
Grand tourers
Rear-wheel-drive vehicles
Coupés
Cars introduced in 1957